Isaie Melanson (October 27, 1883 – March 7, 1964) was a farmer and political figure of Acadian origin in New Brunswick, Canada. He represented Kent County in the Legislative Assembly of New Brunswick as a Liberal member from 1939 to 1956. His first name appears as Isaac in some sources.

He was born in Sainte-Marie, New Brunswick, the son of Onésime Melanson and Geneviève Henrie. In 1911, he married Élise LeBlanc. He operated a dairy farm. Melanson served as warden for Kent County. He served as chairman of the province's Electric Power Commission. He died on March 7, 1964, in Moncton.

References 
 Canadian Parliamentary Guide, 1956, PG Normandin

1883 births
1964 deaths
New Brunswick Liberal Association MLAs
Acadian people